is a Japanese long-distance runner who specializes in the marathon race.

She won the 1999 Tokyo International Women's Marathon and finished seventh at the 2000 Summer Olympics. Her personal best time is 2:22:12 hours.

Achievements

References

Living people
1973 births
Japanese female long-distance runners
Japanese female marathon runners
Olympic female marathon runners
Olympic athletes of Japan
Athletes (track and field) at the 2000 Summer Olympics
Japan Championships in Athletics winners
20th-century Japanese women
21st-century Japanese women